Admiral Sir Ernest Russell Archer, KCB, CBE (14 September 1891 – 17 December 1958) was a Royal Navy officer who became Flag Officer, Scotland and Northern Ireland.

Naval career
Archer joined the Royal Navy in 1904. He served in World War I in destroyers. He also served in World War II as Captain of the battleship  from 1939: in this capacity he led the transport of the UK's gold bullion to Canada in July 1940. He continued his war service as Commander of the Royal Navy Barracks at Portsmouth from 1941, as Senior Naval Officer in North Russia from 1943 and then as Head of the Joint Services Mission to Moscow from 1944. After the War he became Flag Officer, Gibraltar. He was appointed Flag Officer, Scotland and Northern Ireland in 1948 and retired in 1950.

Family
In 1917 he married Margaret Elizabeth Hope Bayly.

References

1891 births
1958 deaths
Royal Navy admirals of World War II
Knights Commander of the Order of the Bath
Commanders of the Order of the British Empire
Royal Navy personnel of World War I
People from Dover, Kent
Military personnel from Kent